Tian, also rendered as Tayun, may refer to:
 Tian, Azna, Lorestan Province
 Tian, Khorramabad, Lorestan Province